Stephen George "Steve" Hargrave (born 27 June 1954) is a former Australian rules footballer who played in the Victorian Football League (VFL) for Footscray and the West Australian National Football League (WANFL) for .

He was a member of Perth's 1976 and 1977 WANFL premiership winning sides.

Hargrave's son, Ryan Hargrave has played over 200 games for the Bulldogs since 2002.

After retiring as a player, Hargrave was the coach of South Fremantle in 1991 and then moved into football administration. Working for the West Australian Football Commission (WAFC) he has been the General Manager of Umpiring and in 2014 is the General Manager of Pathways and Competitions.

References

External links

1954 births
Living people
Australian rules footballers from Western Australia
Western Bulldogs players
Perth Football Club players
South Fremantle Football Club coaches
West Australian Football League administrators